Sthenopis thule, the willow ghost moth,  is a species of moth of the family Hepialidae. It was described by Strecker in 1875, and is known from Canada and the United States, including Ontario, Quebec and Saskatchewan.

The food plant for this species is Salix. They bore in the roots of their host plant. The life cycle probably takes two years to complete.

References

External links
Hepialidae genera

Moths described in 1875
Hepialidae
Taxa named by Herman Strecker